The 1999 Indianapolis Colts season was the 47th season for the team in the National Football League and 16th in Indianapolis. The Indianapolis Colts finished the National Football League's 1999 season with a record of 13 wins and 3 losses, and won the AFC East division. This season marked a turning point for the Colts franchise, who had only made the playoffs 3 times since 1977. Since 1999, the Colts have been one of the more successful NFL franchises,  only missing the playoffs eight times, winning two AFC Championships, and earning a Super Bowl title in Super Bowl XLI. No other turnaround was as great as the 1999 Colts until the 2008 Miami Dolphins went from a 1–15 record to an 11–5 record and an AFC East title.

Despite completing a great turnaround from 3–13 to 13–3, the Colts would go on to lose to the eventual AFC Champion Tennessee Titans in the Divisional Round of the playoffs. After the 1999 season, the Colts never reached the top of the AFC East again, moving to the new AFC South division in 2002.

Offseason 
The Colts made a major trade on April 16 when they sent Marshall Faulk, who rushed for over 1,300 yards and caught 86 passes in 1998, to the St. Louis Rams for two draft picks.

NFL Draft

Undrafted free agents

Personnel

Staff

Roster

Regular season

Schedule

Standings

Notable games

Week 1 vs Bills 
The 1999 Colts season began with a 31–14 rout of the Buffalo Bills. Peyton Manning's fourth career NFL win came via two touchdown throws to Marvin Harrison, an Edgerrin James rushing score, a 74-yard interception return touchdown by Tony Blevins, and a Mike Vanderjagt field goal. Doug Flutie of the Bills had one touchdown throw and two picks.

Week 2 at Patriots 
Manning erupted in the first half, completing 14 of 17 throws with three touchdown throws to Marvin Harrison along with an Edgerrin James rushing score while the Patriots shot themselves in the foot with penalties, ultimately committing fifteen fouls eating up 135 yards and trailing the Colts 28–7. But from the start of the second half the Patriots shut down Manning, limiting him to just four completions in 13 throws. Following a Manning interception in the third quarter a Terry Allen touchdown catch put the Patriots down 28–14, and was followed by 17 unanswered Patriots points; Marcus Pollard fumbled the ball to Ty Law and Drew Bledsoe passes to Terry Glenn led to a three-yard Ben Coates touchdown catch. After Law forced a Manning three-and-out Bledsoe marched the Patriots down field and connected with Coates for a 10-yard tying touchdown with three minutes to go. James was then hammered by Tebucky Jones and fumbled the ball to Brandon Mitchell, and from there the Patriots reached range for Adam Vinatieri's 26-yard game-winner with 35 seconds left in a 31–28 Patriots triumph.

Week 3 at San Diego 
Manning's Indianapolis predecessor Jim Harbaugh started for the Chargers and a Manning score to Marvin Harrison put the Colts up 10–0, but the Chargers scored 16 points in the second quarter. With the Chargers up 19–13 in the fourth Manning scored twice, once on a rush, for the 27–19 win.

Week 5 vs. Dolphins 
The Colts' uneven start to the season continued against the Miami Dolphins, who were going through controversy themselves following reactions by Dan Marino and coach Jimmy Johnson ("I don't always say the right things, but I say what I feel", Johnson said after the Colts game) to a 23–18 loss to Buffalo the week before. Indianapolis clawed to a 17–9 lead in the third quarter, but it was the fourth quarter where the game exploded. First Tony Martin caught a 28-yard Marino touchdown two minutes into the quarter; on the ensuing kickoff Terrence Wilkins ran back 97 yards for a Colts touchdown. Over the next ten minutes Miami's Cecil Collins and Olindo Mare and Indy's Marcus Pollard put the score at 31–25 Indianapolis. With three minutes to go Manning deliberately ran out the back of the endzone for a safety to bleed clock, and the Colts were forced to kick off to Miami. On the ensuing Dolphins drive a Marino pass was initially ruled a fumble but Gerald Austin overruled the penalty after review. Marino drove to the Colts' 2-yard line (the key play was a 58-yard completion to Oronde Gadsden on fourth down; Marino audibled out of what Johnson had intended; Johnson's reluctance to give Marino that power was the main source of friction), and with 27 seconds remaining threw to Oronde Gadsden in the endzone; he caught the ball and was thrown out of bounds before his feet touched the ground inbounds, but following a huddle by referees the play was ruled a touchdown based on force-out rules (which would be changed years later). The 34–31 Dolphins triumph put the Colts at 2–2.

Week 6 at NY Jets 
The Colts fell behind 13–0 in the second quarter, but from there the game (and the season) turned in Indy's favor. A Terrence Wilkins touchdown catch and two Mike Vanderjagt field goals tied the game, then Vanderjagt kicked the game-winner with 14 seconds remaining, putting the Colts to the 16–13 final and the start of an 11-game winning streak.

Week 7 vs. Bengals 
The 1–5 Bengals were never in contention as four Colts touchdowns, two by Edgerrin James, were easily enough in a 31–10 Indianapolis win.

Week 8 vs Cowboys 
The latest Super Bowl V rematch began as the Cowboys, despite Michael Irvin being out for the year with injury, clawed to a 17–3 lead in the second quarter. The Colts then stormed back with 17-straight points. An exchange of touchdowns left the score 28–24 and Troy Aikman was pulled early in the fourth. A scary incident occurred when Mark Thomas of the Colts was accidentally kicked in the head and had to be put on a stretcher.

Week 9 vs. Chiefs 
In a battle of 5–2 teams the lead changed four times as Manning ran in the winning score with 10:49 to go. With the Colts up 25–17 Warren Moon came in for the final twenty two seconds for the Chiefs but his pass to Joe Horn fell incomplete.

Week 10 at NY Giants 

Two Marvin Harrison touchdowns and a Terrence Wilkins punt return score highlighted a 27–19 Colts win. Former Colt Cary Blanchard booted two field goals.

Week 11 at Eagles 
The Colts erupted to their biggest point total of the season with 44. Manning had three touchdowns and Edgerrin James two more. Rookie Donovan McNabb in his second start was picked off twice.

Week 12 vs. NY Jets 
The Jets limited Manning to one touchdown with two picks but Bill Parcells experiment Ray Lucas in his fourth start completed just twelve passes in a 13–6 Colts win.

Week 13 at Dolphins 
The season rematch was another high-scoring affair. Edgerrin James ran in two first-half touchdowns while Chad Cota scored off a Miami fumble for a 24–10 Colts halftime lead. Once again Miami fought back; first Sam Madison picked off Manning and ran back for a 25-yard touchdown, then Dan Marino touchdown throws to Stanley Pritchett and Tony Martin offset a Manning touchdown to Terrence Wilkins and left the score tied at 31 early in the fourth. Mike Vanderjagt's field goal in the final five minutes was answered by an Olindo Mare kick with 36 seconds to go, but the Colts drove to range of a 53-yard Vanderjagt kick on the final play. The kick was good for a 37–34 Colts win, their eighth straight.

Week 14 vs. Patriots 
Peyton Manning's first career win over the Patriots was a 20–15 affair in which he threw for only 186 yards and two touchdowns. The Patriots committed 12 penalties for 86 yards and Drew Bledsoe was sacked five times despite throwing for 379 yards and a late-fourth-quarter touchdown to Shawn Jefferson.

Week 15 vs. Redskins 
Down at the start of the fourth the Colts scored twice, enough to absorb a late Redskins score and successful onside kick; the Skins though failed to convert fourth down for the 24–21 Indianapolis win.

Week 16 at Browns 
The Colts' first trip to Cleveland since a 23–17 loss in 1988 turned into a hard-fought affair. The Colts trailed 14–7 in the second quarter, then trailed 28–19 at the end of the third quarter, but clawed to a 28–26 score in the fourth off an Edgerrin James rushing touchdown, then rallied for the win on a 21-yard Vanderjagt field goal with four seconds left. It was Indy's 13th win of the season, the first 13-win season for the Colts since the ill-fated 1968 Baltimore Colts went 13–1 before facing Joe Namath (ironically following a Colts playoff win over the Browns), and locked up a playoff bye for Indianapolis.

Postseason 

The Colts earned the No. 2 seed for the playoffs and received a bye for the Wild-Card round of the playoffs. They played host to the Tennessee Titans in the Divisional round. This was the first ever NFL playoff game played in Indianapolis. The game was close throughout until Titans running back Eddie George ran for 68-yard touchdown in the 3rd quarter. George rushed for a team playoff-record 162 yards to help lead the Titans to victory.

Awards and records

References

See also 
 History of the Indianapolis Colts
 Indianapolis Colts seasons

Indianapolis Colts
AFC East championship seasons
Indianapolis Colts seasons
Colts